The 2014 Chinese Taipei Open Grand Prix Gold was the ninth grand prix gold and grand prix tournament of the 2014 BWF Grand Prix Gold and Grand Prix. The tournament was held in Taipei Arena, Taipei, Chinese Taipei July 15–20, 2013 and had a total purse of $200,000.

Players by nation

Men's singles

Seeds

  Shon Wan-ho (quarter-final)
  Wang Zhengming (final)
  Hu Yun (third round)
  Nguyen Tien Minh (quarter-final)
  Simon Santoso (third round)
  Chou Tien-chen (first round)
  Lin Dan (champion)
  Hsu Jen-hao (third round)
  Takuma Ueda (quarter-final)
  Wei Nan (semi-final)
  Lee Dong-keun (second round)
  Sourabh Varma (withdrew)
  Henri Hurskainen (first round)
  Tan Chun Seang (second round)
  Wong Wing Ki (third round)
  Wang Tzu-wei (third round)

Finals

Top half

Section 1

Section 2

Section 3

Section 4

Bottom half

Section 5

Section 6

Section 7

Section 8

Women's singles

Seeds

  Sung Ji-hyun (champion)
  Bae Yeon-ju (quarter-final)
  Tai Tzu-ying (second round)
  Han Li (quarter-final)
  Yip Pui Yin (semi-final)
  Liu Xin (final)
  Pai Hsiao-ma (second round)
  Hsu Ya-ching (semi-final)

Finals

Top half

Section 1

Section 2

Bottom half

Section 3

Section 4

Men's doubles

Seeds

  Lee Yong-dae / Yoo Yeon-seong (withdrew)
  Kim Ki-jung / Kim Sa-rang (withdrew)
  Lee Sheng-mu / Tsai Chia-hsin (first round)
  Markus Fernaldi Gideon / Markis Kido (first round)
  Ko Sung-hyun / Shin Baek-cheol (second round)
  Berry Angriawan / Ricky Karanda Suwardi (first round)
  Cai Yun / Lu Kai (first round)
  Liang Jui-wei / Liao Kuan-hao (first round)

Finals

Top half

Section 1

Section 2

Bottom half

Section 3

Section 4

Women's doubles

Seeds

  Wang Xiaoli / Yu Yang (final)
  Jang Ye-na / Kim So-young (quarter-final)
  Jung Kyung-eun / Kim Ha-na (withdrew)
  Nitya Krishinda Maheswari / Greysia Polii (champion)
  Huang Yaqiong / Tang Yuanting (semi-final)
  Ko A-ra / Yoo Hae-won (quarter-final)
  Yuriko Miki / Koharu Yonemoto (first round)
  Ou Dongni / Yu Xiaohan (quarter-final)

Finals

Top half

Section 1

Section 2

Bottom half

Section 3

Section 4

Mixed doubles

Seeds

  Ko Sung-hyun / Kim Ha-na (withdrew)
  Lee Chun Hei / Chau Hoi Wah (withdrew)
  Markis Kido / Pia Zebadiah Bernadeth (semi-final)
  Lu Kai / Huang Yaqiong (second round)
  Shin Baek-cheol / Jang Ye-na (second round)
  Kim Ki-jung / Kim So-young (withdrew)
  Yoo Yeon-seong / Eom Hye-won (quarter-final)
  Lee Yong-dae / Shin Seung-chan (withdrew)

Finals

Top half

Section 1

Section 2

Bottom half

Section 3

Section 4

References

Chinese Taipei Open
Chinese Taipei Open Grand Prix Gold
BWF Grand Prix Gold and Grand Prix
Chinese Taipei Open Grand Prix Gold
Chinese Taipei Open Grand Prix Gold